Ichneutica schistella is a moth of the family Noctuidae. It is endemic to New Zealand.

Taxonomy 
This species was first described by Robert Hoare in 2019. The holotype specimen, held at the Otago Museum, is male and was collected in December 1994 by Brian H. Patrick at the Rock and Pillar Range.

Description 
This species is dark grey and white in colouration. This species can be distinguished from I. cana as it is smaller in size. I. schistella also have distinctive black coloured markings on the edge of its forewings. The male of this species has a wingspan of between 33 and 38mm. The female of this species is unknown.

Geographic range 
This species has only been collected from its type locality the Rock and Pillar Range in Central Otago.

Life history 
The life history of this species is unknown.

Behaviour 
Adult males of this species are on the wing in December.

References

Moths described in 2019
Moths of New Zealand
Noctuinae
Endemic fauna of New Zealand
Taxa named by Robert Hoare
Endemic moths of New Zealand